Siddhant Cinevision Private Limited is an Indian company which produces TV Serials established by Manish Goswami on 2 June 1993. The first TV show was Parampara which was telecasted on Zee TV and later many TV serials was produced i.e. Aashirwad, Chashme Baddoor, Kittie Party, Kaisa Yeh Ishq Hai...Ajab Sa Risk Hai, Aandhi, Kittu Sabb Jaantii Hai, Sarrkkar, Dehleez, etc.

History 
The company registered as 'Siddhant Cinevision Private Limited' in 1993 in Mumbai, India, with the objective of Producing TV serials to entertain the Indian viewers.

TV serials 
The following is the list of Television shows produced under Siddhant Cinevision Private Limited. Note: television series in bold are the shows presently on air.

References

External links 

 Siddhant Cinevision Pvt.Ltd.

Film production companies based in Mumbai
Television production companies of India
Indian companies established in 1993
Entertainment companies established in 1993
1993 establishments in Maharashtra